Amélie Etasse (born 8 June 1984) is a French actress.

The actress is best known for her participation in the television series Scènes de ménages. Beyond theatrical scenes, she also participated in a major advertising campaign for Marque Repère products sold by the mass-market company known as E.Leclerc.

Biography
Amélie Etasse trained at the Claude Mathieu School. She also learns singing at the "Chœur de la Ville" and thanks to Carine Robert. Previously, she studied theatre and dance at the Georges Bizet conservatory, and at a Paris theatre school. She also passed a bachelor's degree "Performing Arts, theatre option" in the 5th arrondissement of Paris.

Amélie Etasse is eclectic. She contributes to the writing of the blog Paris Mieux Mieux and created the character of the Loove, which she embodies in the short series La Loove visible on studio 4 (produced by France Télévisions and Aprile productions). She is an Actor on television and in the theatre.

Filmography

Television
2011: Trop la classe café !: Amélie
2012: Le Jour où tout a basculé (season 2), episode My Sister is Scamming my Mother: Cindy (1 episode)
2013: R.I.S, police scientifique: episode The Threat (season 8), tourist in front of Pantheon
2013: Ma Meuf: Sandra (14 episodes)
2013: Profilage (season 3): young colleague from police station
2013–14: Les Textapes d'Alice: Xtina
2015: Call My Agent!: Magalie (1 episode)
Since 2015: Scènes de ménages: Camille

Short films
2012: Bisou: Sandra Desbains
2013: À dimanche prochain
2013: Le Bisou
2013: L'Homme pince: Carole
2013: Le petit cheval de Troie: Ève
2013: Entre rouge et loup: Rouge
2013: Chachacha: dancer
2013: Sans un mot: wife
2016: Speed/Dating: Sophie

Web series
2014: Les Mordus du Bocal (6play)
2014: Les textapes d'Alice
2015: La Loove (France 4) (she wrote)

Musical comedies
2006–11: Jeux de mots laids pour gens bêtes (Léonie Pingeot): Léna
2011–13: Redis-Le Me (Léonie Pingeot)

Advertising
Amélie Etasse has been the voice-over for commercials broadcast on radio and television from several companies, such as Samsung, Ricola, Matins, Intimy, Europcar, Kwikso and E.Leclerc.

2004: Musée d'Art Contemporain du Val-de-Marne
2005: Canal+
2006: Festival du film étudiant de Québec
2008: Match.com
Since 2010: La Blonde / Marque Repère, E.Leclerc
2011: Groupama
2011: Flunch
2012: Copra
2017: Une serveuse / Lidl

Theatre
2005: Fool For Love (Jean Bellorini): Kate
2007: Je me tiens devant toi nue (Delphine Lequenne): Marianne
2008–09: Après la pluie (Camille de la Guillonnière): blonde secretary
2010: Love in the City (Pascal Buresi): main role
2010: Tango (Camille de la Guillonnière): Aline
2012: Les Colocataires (improvisational theatre)
2012: Doris Darling (Marianne Groves)
2013–14: Bonjour Ivresse (Franck Le Hen)
2017: Bouquet final

Awards and nominations
Prix Mague 2013: Artistic performance of the year in Doris Darling

References

External links
 

 

French television actresses
French musical theatre actresses
1984 births
Actresses from Paris
Living people